Acracona pratti is a species of snout moth in the genus Acracona. It was described by George Hamilton Kenrick in 1917 and is known from Madagascar.

The male of this species has a wingspan of 50 mm, the female of 70 mm.

References

Tirathabini
Moths described in 1917
Snout moths of Africa
Moths of Madagascar
Moths of Africa